The Zener ratio is a dimensionless number that is used to quantify the anisotropy for cubic crystals. It is sometimes referred as anisotropy ratio and is named after Clarence Zener. Conceptually, it quantifies how far a material is from being isotropic (where the value of 1 means an isotropic material).

Its mathematical definition is

where  refers to Elastic constants in Voigt notation.

Cubic materials
Cubic materials are special orthotropic materials that are invariant with respect to 90° rotations with respect to the principal axes, i.e., the material is the same along its principal axes. Due to these additional symmetries the stiffness tensor can be written with just three different material properties like

The inverse of this matrix is commonly written as

Therefore, we can think of the ratio as the relation between the shear modulus for the cubic material and its (isotropic) equivalent:

Universal Elastic Anisotropy Index
The Zener ratio is only applicable to cubic crystals. To overcome this limitation, a 'Universal Elastic Anisotropy Index (AU)'  was formulated from variational principles of elasticity and tensor algebra. The AU is now used to quantify the anisotropy of elastic crystals of all classes.

Tensorial Anisotropy Index
The Tensorial Anisotropy Index AT  extends the Zener ratio for fully anisotropic materials and overcomes the limitation of the AU that is designed for materials exhibiting internal symmetries of elastic crystals, which is not always observed in multi-component composites. It takes into consideration all the 21 coefficients of the fully anisotropic stiffness tensor and covers the directional differences among the stiffness tensor groups.

The second component of this index  covers the influence of stiffness coefficients that are nonzero only for non-cubic materials and remains zero otherwise.

where  is the coefficient of variation for each stiffness group accounting for directional differences of material stiffness, i.e. In cubic materials each stiffness component in groups 1-3 has equal value and thus this expression reduces directly to Zener ratio for cubic materials.

The second component of this index  is non-zero for complex materials or composites with only few or no symmetries in their internal structure. In such cases the remaining stiffness coefficients joined in three groups are not null

See also 
 Anisotropy
 Orthotropic material
 Linear elasticity

References

Crystallography
Orientation (geometry)
Elasticity (physics)